Louis Companyo (born in Céret in 1781 and died in Perpignan in 1871) was a French physician and naturalist.

Louis Companyo was a founder and director of the Musée d'Histoire Naturelle de Perpignan  and wrote Histoire Naturelle du département des Pyrénées-Orientales. Perpignan, 1861–1864, the first book on the natural history of the Pyrenees when over eighty years old. The 3 volumes cover geography,  geology, and paleontology (Volume 1), botany (Volume 2), zoology and entomology (Volume 3).

External links
Louis Companyo in French.

References
Constantin, R. 1992 Memorial des Coléopteristes Français.  Bull. liaison Assoc. Col. reg. parisienne, Paris (Suppl. 14).

19th-century French botanists
French lepidopterists
1781 births
1871 deaths
People from Céret
Date of birth missing
Date of death missing
19th-century French physicians
French naturalists
19th-century naturalists
19th-century French zoologists